"Transparent Soul" (stylized as "t r a n s p a r e n t s o u l") is a song by American singer Willow, featuring American drummer Travis Barker. It was released on April 27, 2021, by MSFTS and Roc Nation, as the lead single from Willow's fourth solo studio album Lately I Feel Everything. The song has been described by publications such as Rolling Stone and Guitar World as a pop-punk track about ingenuine people. A remix of the song featuring American rapper Kid Cudi was released on November 19, 2021.

Background
"Transparent Soul" was written during a "very introspective time" at the beginning of the COVID-19 pandemic, and was inspired by a quote from guru Radhanath Swami. Willow was inclined to enter the punk rock genre by her mother Jada Pinkett Smith, who previously fronted the nu metal band Wicked Wisdom.

Lyrically, the song details Willow's struggles with fake people who seek to exploit her, which she can tell by her ability to see the qualities through their "transparent" souls. She plays an Ernie Ball Music Man St. Vincent signature guitar on the track.

Music video
A performance visual for "Transparent Soul" was released alongside the song on April 27, 2021. The visual features Willow dressed in "classic punk attire—spiked collars and all" while performing the single. Revolt described it as "almost reminiscent of classic rock and roll videos", with Willow "rocking wild fashions that range from colorful to goth" overlaid with various special effects." Travis Barker does not make an appearance in the "short-yet-energetic" production. As of March 2022, the visual has received over 17 million views on YouTube.

The official music video for "Transparent Soul", with both Willow and Barker, was released on May 28, 2021. The video featured a cameo appearance from DJ duo Simi and Haze Khadra. In the video, Willow is seen in a "dingy rock club" performing the song with Barker, when she runs into a mysterious and terrifying figure who follows her. She collapses on the ground, and the video ends with her reaching her hand out to the figure.

Remix
On November 19, 2021, Willow released the remix to "Transparent Soul" featuring vocals from American rapper Kid Cudi. This marked the second collaboration between the musicians, following Willow appearing on "Rose Golden" from Cudi's sixth studio album Passion, Pain & Demon Slayin' (2016).

Personnel
Credits adapted from Tidal.
Willow Smith – vocals, composition, lyrics
Travis Barker – drums, composition, lyrics
Tyler Cole – production, composition, lyrics
Michelle Mancini – mastering
Mario J. McNulty – mixing
Zach Brown – engineering

Charts

Weekly charts

Year-end charts

Certifications

Release history

References

2021 singles
2021 songs
Willow Smith songs
Songs written by Willow Smith
Travis Barker songs
Songs written by Travis Barker
American pop punk songs
Roc Nation singles